Superheaven (formerly known as Daylight) is an American alternative rock band from Doylestown, Pennsylvania, a borough outside of Philadelphia and within the Philadelphia metro area. Their music has been described as reminiscent of 1990s grunge and shoegaze.

History
As Daylight, the band formed early in 2008 and released their debut extended play Sinking in 2009 via Get This Right Records. They released their second EP Dispirit in 2010 via Six Feet Under Records, and their third, The Difference in Good and Bad Dreams, in 2012 via Run for Cover Records (together with an acoustic EP). Their debut studio album Jar was released in April 2013 on the same label and reached number 184 on the Billboard 200 chart. The band was featured on Alternative Press'''s list of "39 up-and-coming bands you must check out before 2013 ends". Following a legal dispute with a Spanish band of the same name, Daylight changed their name to Superheaven in early 2014. Later the same year, the band signed to SideOneDummy Records. They released their second album Ours Is Chrome in May 2015. 

Following the end of their tour in support of Ours is Chrome, the band ceased full-time activity. Madison and Clarke formed a new band, Webbed Wing, in 2017. Their debut album, Bike Ride Across the Moon, was released in 2019. Robbins formed DARK MTNS with Gunk's Josh Mackie, releasing their debut album Up Above This Cloud in 2017. He also played in the band Flight Habit. Kane largely retired from music and started his own carpentry business, Cliffside Carpenter.

The band did, however, play several one-off reunion shows in the following years. In December 2017, Superheaven played a secret set alongside Tigers Jaw and Turnstile for a charity event for Philabundence, put on by music producer Will Yip. A few days after, the band announced a one-off show benefitting Planned Parenthood on March 2, 2018, at The Other Side in Wilkes Barre, Pennsylvania. They also played with Balance and Composure on their final tour in 2019.

Superheaven again reunited in 2022 to play Manchester's Outbreak Fest in June — alongside Turnstile, Knocked Loose, and Basement — as well as playing at London's New Cross Inn. In November 2022, it was announced the band would play Sick New World fest in Las Vegas in May 2023. This was followed by a full tour announcement in January 2023, where the band will celebrate the 10-year anniversary of Jar''.

Members
Current members
 Jake Clarke – lead vocals, guitar (2008–2016, 2017, 2018, 2019, 2022–present)
 Joe Kane – bass (2008–2016, 2017, 2018,  2019, 2022–present)
 Taylor Madison – lead vocals, guitar (2008–2016, 2017, 2018, 2019, 2022–present)
 Zack Robbins – drums, backing vocals (2012–2016, 2017, 2018, 2019, 2022–present)

Former members
 John Bowes – drums (2008–2012)

Discography

Studio albums

Extended plays

Music videos

References

Rock music groups from Pennsylvania
Alternative rock groups from Pennsylvania
American grunge groups
Musical groups from Philadelphia
2008 establishments in Pennsylvania
Musical groups established in 2008
SideOneDummy Records artists
Musical quartets
Run for Cover Records artists